Blessagno (Comasco:   or  ) is a comune (municipality) in the Province of Como in the Italian region Lombardy, located about  north of Milan and about  north of Como.

Blessagno borders the following municipalities: Centro Valle Intelvi, Dizzasco, Laino, Pigra.

References

Cities and towns in Lombardy